Écoute (French "listen") may refer to:

"Écoute" (song), song by Alexandra Stan
"Écoute", song by Dufresne to a poem by Gustave de Penmarch 1854
Écoute (magazine), German French-language magazine
Écoute (sculpture)'', Henri de Miller, Paris